Cacimbinhas is a municipality in the western of the Brazilian state of Alagoas. Its population is 10,889 (2020) and its area is 273 km².

References

Municipalities in Alagoas